Hian (also Romanized as Hīān, Heyān, and Hiyan) is a village in Zarabad-e Gharbi Rural District, Zarabad District, Konarak County, Sistan and Baluchestan Province, Iran. At the 2006 census, its population was 395, in 75 families.

Sbisbosv. Coaifco

Hablamos. Modelos
Bvid. Mivd9
Ermitaño. Na

References 

Populated places in Konarak County

E ue.ídolo wbumisov
Dolor ekodki